The Singing Cave is a children's novel by Margaret Carver Leighton and illustrated by Manning de V. Lee. It was published in 1945 by Houghton Mifflin. It first appeared as a serial in the Christian Science Monitor in summer 1944.

Plot summary
Southern California ranch boy Billy Deane dreads the arrival of Penny, a visitor from New York. Eventually, he befriends her, and they search for artifacts around the area with their Native American friend Felipe. They encounter smugglers and the mystery of the singing cave, and they discover rare artifacts. Eventually, they find the Singing Cave and discover its mystery.

Reception
The book was well received by critics. Virginia Kirkus found it "a fast-moving and well-written story," while May Lamberton Becker praised it for "combining attractions of a mystery with those of a ranch story."

References

External links
Guide to the Margaret Carver Leighton Papers, 1937-1973 via Northwest Digital Archives

1945 American novels
American children's novels
Novels set in California
Children's mystery novels
1945 children's books